John of Saxony is the name of:
 John the Old Saxon an Anglo-Saxon scholar and abbot of Athelney
 John I, Duke of Saxony (1249–1285, Duke 1260–1282)
 John of Saxony (astronomer) (fl. 1327–1355).
 John, Elector of Saxony (1468–1532).
 John of Saxony (1801–1873, King of Saxony, 1854–1873).